Antilloides is a genus of spiders in the family Filistatidae. It was first described in 2016 by Brescovit, Sánchez-Ruiz & Alayón. , it contains 5 species, all from the Caribbean.

References

Filistatidae
Araneomorphae genera
Spiders of the Caribbean
Arthropods of the Dominican Republic